Sipho Ngema (21 July 1972 – 21 April 2020), was a South African actor. He is best known for the roles in the television serials such as; Rhythm City and Uzalo.

Personal life
Ngema was born on 21 July 1972 and grew up in Durban, KwaZulu Natal, South Africa.

He was married and was a father of six children including, Mbali.

He died on 21 April 2020 at the age of 47 at 10.15pm while receiving treatment in Johannesburg. The death cause was heart failure due to pulmonary hypertension.

Career
In 2010, he made a recurring role as "Raymond" in the e.tv soap opera Rhythm City. His role became very popular where he continued to play the role for many years. In 2011, he acted in the e.tv anthology series eKasi: Our Stories and kykNET drama Hartland, both with supportive roles. In 2013, he appeared in the Mzansi Magic miniseries Stash and played the supporting role of "Luthando". In the same year, he played the role "Mike" in the police procedural miniseries Shabangu P.I. and then in comedy miniseries Uyaphapha, both were telecast on Mzansi Magic.

In 2014, he made a minor role in the SABC 1 Docu-Drama Amagugu. In 2017, he joined with the season three of the SABC1 popular soap opera Uzalo. In the soapie, he played a recurring role as "Terror". After that success, he joined with fifth season of SABC 2 comedy serial Skwizas to play the role "Pitso". Later in 2018, he made a guest role in the SABC1 series Diamond City. In 2019, he joined with fourth season of Mzansi Magic telenovela The Queen and played the role "Sjekula". His final television appearance came through Netflix South Africa supernatural series Kings of Jo'burg, where he played the role "Jomo, Menzi's Goon".

Filmography

References

External links
 IMDb

1972 births
2020 deaths
South African male film actors
South African male television actors
People from Durban
Deaths from hypertension